Martha Darley Mutrie (26 August 1824 – 30 December 1885) was a British painter. Her paintings consisted mostly of fruit and flowers.  She grew up in Manchester, England, and studied at the Manchester School of Design. Mutrie's works were shown at the Royal Academy of Arts, Royal Manchester Institution and other national and international exhibitions. Her works are among the collections of the Victoria and Albert Museum and the Russell-Cotes Art Gallery & Museum.

Personal life
Martha Mutrie was born in Ardwick on 26 August 1824, and was the oldest daughter of Robert Mutrie, a cotton trader from Rothesay, Bute, Scotland. She had one younger sister, Annie Feray Mutrie, born on 6 March 1826 in Manchester.  Her family soon settled in Manchester. Martha Mutrie moved to London in 1854, and died in Kensington, England on 30 December 1885. Her sister, Annie died on 28 September 1893 in Brighton.

Education and career
Mutrie studied under George Wallis at the Manchester School of Design between the years of 1844 to 1846. She continued her education at Wallis' private academy. Mutrie exhibited at the Royal Academy of Arts, the Royal Manchester Institution, and other English and international exhibitions. Fruit and Spring Flowers were shown at the Royal Academy in 1853 and 1854, respectively. John Ruskin appreciated her works, Primulas and Geraniums, at the academy's 1856 exhibition and commented upon them in his "Notes on some of the Principal Pictures in the Royal Academy." Mutrie has a painting in the Victoria and Albert Museum and the Russell-Cotes Art Gallery & Museum.

See also
English women painters from the early 19th century who exhibited at the Royal Academy of Art

 Sophie Gengembre Anderson
 Mary Baker
 Ann Charlotte Bartholomew
 Maria Bell
 Barbara Bodichon
 Joanna Mary Boyce
 Margaret Sarah Carpenter
 Fanny Corbaux
 Rosa Corder
 Mary Ellen Edwards
 Harriet Gouldsmith
 Mary Harrison (artist)
 Jane Benham Hay
 Anna Mary Howitt
 Mary Moser
 Ann Mary Newton
 Emily Mary Osborn
 Kate Perugini
 Louise Rayner
 Ellen Sharples
 Rolinda Sharples
 Rebecca Solomon
 Elizabeth Emma Soyer
 Isabelle de Steiger
 Henrietta Ward

References

1824 births
1885 deaths
19th-century British women artists
19th-century English painters
Artists from Manchester
English women painters
People from Ardwick
Sibling artists
19th-century English women